Jean-Baptiste Anet (or Annet) (2 January 1676 – 14 August 1767) was a French violinist and composer.

He was born in Paris. He studied with Arcangelo Corelli for four years in Rome. Afterwards, he returned to Paris about 1700, and was met with the greatest success. There can be little doubt that by his example the principles of the great Italian school of violin-playing were first introduced into France. Probably owing to the jealousy of his French colleagues Anet soon left Paris again, and is said to have spent the rest of his life as conductor of the private band of a nobleman in Poland.

He published three sets of sonatas for the violin.

Published works
  (Paris, 1724)
  (Paris, 1726)
  (Paris, 1729)
  (Paris, 1730)
  (Paris, 1730)
  (Paris, 1734)

Selected recordings 
Sonate n 11, du Premier Livre de Sonates à violon seul et la basse (1724), Théotime Langlois de Swarte, violin, Justin Taylor, harpsichord. CD Alpha 2022 Diapason d’or

Notes

References

External links
 

18th-century French male violinists
French Baroque composers
French male composers
1676 births
1767 deaths
17th-century male musicians